Peavey Mart is a Red Deer, Alberta-based chain of hardware and agricultural supply stores owned by Peavey Industries LP. The chain was originally founded by the Peavey Company in 1967 as National Farmway Stores, and was renamed Peavey Mart in 1974. The chain was acquired by its Canadian management in 1984.

The chain primarily operates in Western Canada. In 2016, Peavey Industries acquired the Canadian operations of Tractor Supply Company (TSC); its locations were rebranded as Peavey Mart, expanding the chain into Ontario. In 2020, Peavey Industries acquired the Canadian master license to Ace Hardware from Rona, servicing its 107 locations.

History 
The company was first established in Winnipeg in 1967 as National Farmway Stores, under the ownership of the National Grain division of the Minneapolis-based Peavey Company. Its first location was located in Dawson Creek, British Columbia. In 1974, Peavey Company sold National Grain but retained the National Farmway Stores division, renaming it Peavey Mart. In 1982, Peavey Company was acquired by ConAgra, which planned to fold the Peavey Mart chain due to its performance. In 1984, Peavey Mart was  acquired by its management, including Rick Anderson (the father of present-day CEO Doug Anderson), making it a Canadian-owned company.

In 2012, Peavey Industries established a new, smaller hardware store concept, MainStreet Hardware, at three locations in Blackfalds, Ponoka and Vermilion, Alberta. 

In July 2016, Peavey Industries acquired a controlling interest in the Canadian division of TSC from Birch Hill Equity Partners, including 51 stores and its London, Ontario distribution centre. Peavey Industries completed its acquisition of the division in 2017; the acquisition more than doubled the company's retail footprint from 34 stores, predominantly in Western Canada, to 85 with an expanded presence in Manitoba and Ontario. The Manitoba TSC stores were rebranded as Peavey Mart in 2016, and the Ontario stores in 2021.

In March 2020, Peavey Industries acquired the Canadian master license for Ace Hardware from Lowe's-owned Rona. Peavey is maintaining the 107-store Ace chain, but began to stock their store brands at its locations, and integrated the stores into Peavey Mart's expanded ecommerce operations.

In May 2021, Peavey Mart began construction of a new flagship location in Red Deer.

Sponsorship 
In July 2021, Peavey Mart acquired the naming rights to the Westerner Park Centrium in Red Deer under a five-year agreement.

References

External links

1967 establishments in Manitoba
Red Deer, Alberta
Hardware stores of Canada